Hang Seng School of Commerce (HSSC) was a Hong Kong business school. The School was officially opened in 12th February, 1981. In 2010, the school was promoted to a private university-level institution (The Hang Seng Management College). In 2018, Hang Seng Management College was granted university status and was renamed as The Hang Seng University of Hong Kong.

History
Hang Seng School of Commerce was founded in 1980 with funding from Hang Seng Bank, the S.H.Ho Foundation and several Hang Seng Bank directors. From 1980 to 2009, Hang Seng School of Commerce was a pioneering and leading provider of post-secondary programmes in business and related areas.

Programs
The school offered programs in business and related subjects:

Diploma Courses
Two-year full-time Hong Kong A-level course
One-year Pre-Associate Degree
Two-year associate degree
One-year Top-up Degree Programmes

See also
University of Hong Kong
Chinese University of Hong Kong
Hong Kong University of Science and Technology
Hang Seng Management College
Hang Seng University of Hong Kong
Education in Hong Kong

References

External links
Hang Seng School of Commerce

Secondary schools in Hong Kong
Sixth form colleges in Hong Kong
Siu Lek Yuen
Hang Seng Bank
Educational institutions established in 1980
Educational institutions disestablished in 2012